Micropentila brunnea, the brown dots, is a butterfly in the family Lycaenidae. It is found in Sierra Leone, Liberia, Ivory Coast, Ghana, Nigeria, Cameroon, Equatorial Guinea, Gabon, the Republic of the Congo and the Democratic Republic of the Congo. The habitat consists of primary forests.

Subspecies
Micropentila brunnea brunnea (Sierra Leone, Liberia, Ivory Coast, Ghana, Nigeria: south and Cross River loop, Cameroon, Equatorial Guinea: Bioko)
Micropentila brunnea centralis Bennett, 1966 (Gabon, Congo, Democratic Republic of the Congo: Ituri, North Kivu, Sankuru and Lualaba)

References

Butterflies described in 1887
Poritiinae
Butterflies of Africa
Taxa named by William Forsell Kirby